The Girls Doubles tournament of the 2014 BWF World Junior Championships was held on April 13–18. South Korean pair Chae Yoo-jung and Kim Ji-won won the last tournament but they could not defend their title due to the age eligibility.

Chen Qingchen who lost in the final last year won the title this year along with her new partner Jia Yifan. They beat Indonesian pair, Rosyita Eka Putri Sari and Apriani Rahayu 21-11, 21-14.

Seeded

  Chen Qingchen / Jia Yifan (champion)
  Pacharapun Chochuwong / Chanisa Teachavorasinskun (quarter-final)
  Du Yue / Li Yinhui (semi-final)
  Arisa Higashino / Wakana Nagahara (third round)
  Sinta Arum Antasari / Marsheilla Gischa Islami (second round)
  Vitalia Chigintseva / Elizaveta Pyatina (second round)
  Jiang Binbin / Tang Pingyang (semi-final)
  Kim Hye-jeong / Kong Hee-yong (third round)
  Akane Araki / Chiharu Shida (quarter-final)
  Ira Banerjee / Jessica Pugh (third round)
  Elaine Chua Yi Ling / Yeo Jiamin (first round)
  Ditte Soby Hansen / Julie Dawall Jakobsen (first round)
  Luise Heim / Yvonne Li (third round)
  Kim Ga-eun / Kim Hyang-im (first round)
  Park Keun-hye / Yoon Min-ah (quarter-final)
  Rosyita Eka Putri Sari / Apriani Rahayu (final)

Draw

Finals

Top Half

Section 1

Section 2

Section 3

Section 4

Bottom Half

Section 5

Section 6

Section 7

Section 8

References
Main Draw

2014 BWF World Junior Championships
2014 in youth sport